General elections were held in Singapore on 22 December 1984. President Devan Nair dissolved parliament on 4 December 1984 on the advice of Prime Minister Lee Kuan Yew. The result was a victory for the People's Action Party, which won 77 of the 79 seats, marking the first time since 1963 that at least one opposition candidate was elected to parliament in a general election, although the first presence of an opposition MP was in the 1981 Anson by-election.

Background
In his 1983 National Day Rally speech, Prime Minister Lee Kuan Yew lamented that declining birth rates and large number of graduate women remaining single or not marrying their intellectual equal could see Singapore's talent pool shrink. The PAP government then proceeded to launch the "Graduate Mothers' Scheme" to entice graduate women with incentives to get married and grant graduate mothers priority in the best schools for their third child. The proposal was met with anger by the Singapore public (including many female graduates) and the PAP government drew accusations of elitism, and even eugenics. Notably, prominent PAP stalwarts like Deputy Prime Minister S. Rajaratnam and also ex-minister Toh Chin Chye expressed opposition to the proposal.

In March 1984, Health Minister Howe Yoon Chong released a controversial proposal to raise the age for the withdrawal of Central Provident Fund (CPF) savings from 55 to 60 years. At a news conference on 26 March 1984, Howe reasoned that Singaporeans could not depend only on their children in their old age. That suggestion, part of the 54-page report of the Committee on the Problems of the Aged which he chaired, was eventually dropped. Taking up the suggestions in the report, the Singapore Government subsequently introduced the Minimum Sum scheme. This allows workers to withdraw some of their CPF funds at age 55, setting aside a certain minimum sum which can only be withdrawn at retirement age, currently at 62 years.

These controversial proposals sparked debate and uproar in the Singapore electorate and were said to have contributed to a big dip in PAP's support and its share of votes plunged by 12.9% to below 64.8%, the biggest fall and the lowest for PAP since the 1963 General Election (this remains the largest anti-PAP swing ever in a seriously contested general election as of 2020). In his memoirs, Lee Kuan Yew recalled that the swing against the PAP was larger than what he expected.

New candidates/outgoing incumbents
Minister of Finance Hon Sui Sen died during his term on 14 October 1983 and his seat of Havelock was vacated, but no by-election was held on the constituency, and announced to be merged into Delta constituency. Tony Tan succeeded Hon as the new Finance Minister.

PM Lee's son Lee Hsien Loong (who went on to become the nation's third (and current) Prime Minister) made his debut in the seat of Teck Ghee, while PAP stalwarts Dr Goh Keng Swee and Ong Pang Boon stepped down. In the only election among several preceding and succeeding ones, the election deposit ($1,500) remained unchanged. The Workers' Party of Singapore (WP) secretary-general J. B. Jeyaretnam successfully retained the Anson constituency with an increased majority, while the Singapore Democratic Party made its first in-road into Parliament with the victory of Chiam See Tong, who would serve the Potong Pasir Single Member Constituency for the next 26 years until 2011; this also began a continuing trend whereas three political parties were represented in Parliament (regardless of status as a NCMP or an elected MP) with the exception of 1986-88 (due to the disqualification of sole-WP candidate J. B. Jeyaretnam in 1986), and 2015-20 (all the nine minimum opposition seats were awarded to a single party of WP, with three being NCMPs).

Non-Constituency Member of Parliament scheme
A new Non-Constituency Member of Parliament scheme was introduced whereby between three and six seats, the exact number which was decided by the President of Singapore, would be offered to unsuccessful opposition candidates with the best scores and who garner at least 15% of the votes if any one party wins all the seats, subtracting one NCMP seat for every one opposition MP elected. Opposition parties dismissed the scheme for misleading voters into thinking that they could have opposition MPs without voting for them. M.P.D. Nair of WP who contested Jalan Kayu was the first to be offered but declined. The offer was then made to Singapore United Front's Tan Chee Kien who contested Kaki Bukit, who also declined, and no further offers were made.

Timeline

Electoral boundaries

The newer constituencies are those with rapid developments of Ang Mo Kio, Tampines, Jurong East, Bedok & Jurong West (smaller developments), while other constituencies were dissolved, which was reflected in the table:

New/Outgoing MP

: A caret indicates that the constituency was removed and absorbed to other wards.

Results
Chua Chu Kang SMC United People's Front candidate Teo Kim Hoe who garnered only 196 votes, or 0.81% of the valid votes cast, set a worst-scoring result for any candidates in the history of the election until the 2013 by-election where Desmond Lim surpassed the record with 168 votes or 0.53% of the valid votes; not counting by-elections, the record has also be broken by independent candidate Samir Salim Neji in the 2015 general election, with 150 votes or 0.60% of the valid votes.

Excluding the 30 uncontested constituencies, the voter turnout was 95.6%, with 63.2% of the total electorate casting their votes.

By constituency

Notes

References

Singapore
General elections in Singapore
1984 in Singapore